Desejo Proibido is a Brazilian telenovela produced and broadcast by TV Globo from November 5, 2007 to May 2, 2008.

Cast 
 Fernanda Vasconcellos as Laura de Castro
 Murilo Rosa as Padre Miguel Meireles
 Daniel de Oliveira as Henrique
 Eva Wilma as Cândida Novaes de Toledo
 Letícia Sabatella as Ana de Castro Fernandes
 Alexandre Borges as Dr. Antônio Escobar
 José de Abreu as Francisco Fernandes
 Pedro Neschling as Diogo
 Fernanda Paes Leme as Teresinha Mendonça
 Guilherme Berenguer as Tenente João Antônio Teixeira
 Deborah Evelyn as Madalena Borges
 Cássio Gabus Mendes as Delegate Trajano Mendonça
 Lima Duarte as Prefeito Viriato Palhares
 Nívea Maria as Magnólia Cardoso Palhares
 Grazi Massafera as Florinda Cardoso Palhares
 Rodrigo Lombardi as Ciro Feijó
 Letícia Birkheuer as Dr. Raquel Castanhal
 Caio Junqueira as Dr. Gaspar Martins
 Camila Rodrigues as Guilhermina Mendonça
 Sthefany Brito as Dulcina
 Thiago Martins as Lídio Lourenço
 Emílio Orciollo Neto as Argemiro Borges Patápio
 Júlia Lemmertz as Belinda
 Pedro Paulo Rangel as Galileu "Boticário"
 Ana Lima as Eulália Palhares Patápio
 Marcos Caruso as Padre Inácio Gouveia
 Othon Bastos as Alcebíades "Cebíade" Patápio
 Roberto Bomfim as Dioclécio
 Cláudio Marzo as Lázaro Simões
 Jandira Martini as Guaracyaba "Dona Guará"
 Eliana Fonseca as Pureza Borges Patápio "Dona Puzerinha"
 Luiz Carlos Tourinho as Anésio "Nezinho"
 Paulo César Grande as Valdenor
 Thaís Garayp as Iraci de Castro
 Osvaldo Mil as Germano
 Cosme dos Santos as Faustino
 Marcélia Cartaxo as Antonieta "Tonha"
 André Arteche as Clemente
 Nando Cunha as Soldado Brasil
 Mary Sheyla as Maria Aparecida "Cidinha" Conceição da Penha
 Gilberto Hernandez as Dr. Amilcar Noronha
 Bruna Marquezine as Maria Augusta Mendonça
 Júlia Matos as Elisa Borges Patápio
 Leonardo Rocha as Jacinto Borges Patápio
 Orã Figueiredo as Camaleão
 Cinara Leal as Doralice
 Miguel Oliveira as Tonico

Soundtrack 
Cover: Murilo Rosa

 Aqui - Ana Carolina (tema de Laura e Miguel)
 Trem das Cores - Caetano Veloso (tema de locação: Passaperto)
 Rosa  - Marisa Monte (tema de Viriato e Cândida / tema de Viriato e Magnólia)
 Denseredo (Ao Vivo) - Roberta Sá e Boca Livre (tema de Ana)
 Sonho Lindo - Tânia Mara (tema de abertura)
 Amor de Índio - Roupa Nova (tema de Laura)
 Todo Azul do Mar - 14 Bis (tema de Miguel)
 O Trenzinho do Caipira - Boca Livre (tema geral)
 Tamanho Não é Documento - Eduardo Dusek (tema de Nezinho)
 Deusa da Minha Rua - Ivo Pessoa (tema de Eulália e Argemiro)
 Céu Cor-de-rosa (Indian Summer) - Sidney Magal (tema de Florinda)
 Danada da Preguiça - Luk Brown (tema de Alcebíades)
 Tipo Zero - Edson Cordeiro (tema de Ciro Feijó)
 Diabinho Maluco (Instrumental)  - Joel Nascimento
 Ave Maria - Selma Reis (tema do núcleo religioso / tema do Padre Inácio)
 Hino Sertanejo  - Tonico e Tinoco (tema de Soldado Brasil)

External links 
Desejo Proibido (Official Website)

2007 telenovelas
2007 Brazilian television series debuts
2008 Brazilian television series endings
Brazilian telenovelas
TV Globo telenovelas
Television shows set in Brazil
Fiction set in the 1930s
Portuguese-language telenovelas
Television series set in the 1930s